Impact Pictures is an independent film production company founded in 2001 by British filmmakers Jeremy Bolt and Paul W. S. Anderson. Aside from Anderson's film projects (including the Resident Evil film series), the company has also been involved in a number of TV and independent productions.

The company has collaborated with several larger studios, most frequently Davis Films, Constantin Film and Screen Gems.

Films 

 The Big Fish
 Shopping
 Event Horizon
 Soldier
 Vigo
 The Sight
 Stiff Upper Lips
 There's Only One Jimmy Grimble
 Massacre Up North
 The Hole
 Resident Evil
 The Dark
 AVP: Alien vs. Predator 
 Resident Evil: Apocalypse
 DOA: Dead or Alive
 Death Race
 Resident Evil: Extinction
 Pandorum
 Resident Evil: Afterlife
 The Three Musketeers
 Lost Christmas
 Pompeii
 Resident Evil: Retribution
 Resident Evil: The Final Chapter
 Monster Hunter (under AB2 Digital Pictures)
 Resident Evil: Welcome to Raccoon City

References

External links 
 Impact Pictures (United Kingdom) at IMDb
 Impact Pictures (United States) at IMDb
 Impact Pictures (Canada) at IMDb
 Davis Films/Impact Pictures at IMDb

Film production companies of the United Kingdom
2001 establishments